Morrisson v Robertson (1908 SC 332) is a case establishing the common law principles that govern unilateral error in Scots law.

Facts
A man claiming to be the son of Wilson of Bonnyrigg approached Morrisson and offered to buy two cows from him. Although Morrisson did not know the man, he knew of Wilson, who was a neighbouring farmer of good financial standing. Accordingly, he let the man have the two cows on credit. In fact, the man was not the son of Wilson but a rogue called Telford. Telford sold the two cows to Robertson. When Morrisson found this out he sought to recover the cows from Robertson.

Judgment
The action was successful. It was held that there had been no contract between Morrisson and Telford. The purported transaction was a complete nullity. Accordingly, Telford had no rights which he could pass on to Robertson, so Morrisson was entitled to recover his cows.

See also
 Cundy v Lindsay (1878) 3 App Cas 459, a similar case in English law
 Shogun Finance Ltd v Hudson, a 2003 case

References 

 Contract, Third Edition, Greens Concise Scots Law, Stephen Woolman & Jonathan Lake.

Scottish case law
1908 in case law
1908 in Scotland
Scots law articles needing infoboxes
1908 in British law